The Melbourne Basketball Association (MBA) is an administrative basketball association in Melbourne, Australia. The association is responsible for two divisions: the Melbourne Tigers Junior Basketball Club and the Melbourne Tigers senior men's and women's representative teams.

Melbourne Tigers history
The remnants of the Melbourne Basketball Association began in the 1920s with the birth of basketball in Victoria. Senior men's basketball teams began playing in the 1920s in local church halls around Melbourne, and in 1931, the Victorian Basketball Association (VBA) established a first division men's competition.

The Melbourne senior men's club began as St Lukes from North Fitzroy, where basketball games were played at St Lukes hall from 1924. The name of the club went through an evolution process where the club changed from St Lukes to Church of England, to becoming Church. It then became Melbourne Church and finally in 1975 the club decided to change its name to Melbourne Tigers. This was felt to better represent the players playing for the club, and thus give it a name that all could follow.

The Junior Boys' Club originated from the Saturday night CEBS (Church of England Boys' Society) competition run at Albert Park from 1959. Junior girls' basketball was not played until 1968.

Junior club
The Melbourne Tigers Junior Basketball Club was founded by Ken Watson. Watson coached the cream of the sport – the national team at the 1956 and 1968 Olympic Games, state teams during a period when Victoria dominated, the Tigers' senior teams from the 1940s to the 1970s, when he handed over to Lindsay Gaze, and the Tigers' juniors until the early 2000s. The club is based at the inner Melbourne suburb of Albert Park and fields teams for both boys and girls from under 12s to under 20s, all of whom play in the Victorian Junior Basketball League (VJBL).

Senior men's team
Between 1965 and 1970, the Melbourne Tigers senior men's team, then known as Melbourne Church of England, was the South Eastern Conference (SEC) Champion every single year. In 1971, the league was abandoned due to the annual Australian Club Championship. However, in 1981, the competition resurfaced as the South Eastern Basketball League (SEBL) and the Tigers entered the league. By 1982, the Tigers were runners-up, and by 1983, the Tigers won their first SEBL Championship.

In 1984, the Melbourne Basketball Association entered the Tigers senior men's team into the National Basketball League (NBL) after decades of supremacy over Victorian basketball. By 2002, poor management had led losses to mount rapidly in the so-called professional phase of the Melbourne Basketball Association's ownership of the NBL franchise. Following the 2001–02 NBL season, the "friends of the Tigers" syndicate purchased the Melbourne Tigers NBL team, as the franchise entered into private ownership led by Seamus McPeake, ending the team's direct affiliation with the Melbourne Basketball Association.

In 2004, the MBA re-established a senior men's team and entered the team into the Big V State Championship division. In 2008, the team won their first Big V title. Their squad featured many of the NBL team's players such as Daryl Corletto, Tommy Greer and Daniel Johnson. They went on to win back-to-back titles in 2009 thanks to Finals MVP Daryl Corletto.

The Tigers senior men's team continued on in the Big V until in December 2015, the team was elevated into the South East Australian Basketball League (SEABL) for the 2016 season, with Tigers NBL legend Andrew Gaze taking the reins as head coach. In October 2017, Nick Abdicevic took over from Gaze for the 2018 season.

Senior women's team
The Melbourne Tigers senior women's team won six out of seven Victorian State Championships between 1992 and 1998, and won back-to-back Big V State Championship titles in 2003 and 2004.

In October 2016, the senior women's team was elevated into the South East Australian Basketball League (SEABL) for the 2017 season.

In 2019, following the demise of the SEABL, the Tigers joined the NBL1 South.

References

External links

Melbourne Basketball Association official website
Melbourne Tigers senior club official website
Melbourne Tigers junior club official website

Big V teams
South East Australian Basketball League teams
Basketball teams established in 1931
1931 establishments in Australia
Basketball teams in Melbourne